The first season of Stargate Universe consists of 20 episodes. Brad Wright and Robert C. Cooper wrote the three-parter series opener named "Air", which was originally planned to be a two-parter. The first two parts of "Air" premiered on Syfy on October 2, 2009, with regularly weekly airing beginning on October 9, 2009. "Fire" was originally going to be the title for episode four, but the story and script was too big to be able to fit into one episode, so the producers changed it to become a two-parter called "Darkness" and "Light", therefore pushing all future episodes forward one slot. "Justice" was the mid-season finale. The back half of the first season aired on Friday April 2, 2010 on Space and Syfy.

British channel Sky1 acquired the exclusive UK rights to Stargate Universe and began airing the series from October 6, 2009. The series then aired on Space in Canada. In Australia Stargate Universe commenced airing on free-to-air-TV on Network TEN from 20:30 on Monday 14 December 2009, broadcasting the first two episodes: "Air (Part 1)" and "Air (Part 2)" as a movie-length premiere. However, Network TEN dropped the series after just three weeks. All available episodes were however fast-tracked from the US and broadcast on the Sci Fi Channel on Foxtel screening in Australia only 'days' after the US.

Main cast
 Starring Robert Carlyle as Dr. Nicholas Rush
 Louis Ferreira as Colonel Everett Young
 Brian J. Smith as First Lieutenant Matthew Scott
 Elyse Levesque as Chloe Armstrong
 David Blue as Eli Wallace
 Alaina Huffman as First Lieutenant Tamara Johansen
 With Jamil Walker Smith as Master Sergeant Ronald Greer
 And Ming-Na as Camile Wray

Episodes

Reception 
The series premier was watched by 2.346 million viewers. By the end of the season the show had maintained 65% of its audience, with the finale drawing 1.469 million viewers, which was higher than the premier of Breaking Bad.

Media releases

See also 
 List of Stargate Universe episodes

References

General references

External links

 Season 1 on GateWorld
 Season 1 on IMDb

 
2010 American television seasons
2009 American television seasons
Universe 01
2009 Canadian television seasons
2010 Canadian television seasons